Kingdom Come is the ninth studio album by American rapper Jay-Z. It was released on November 21, 2006, through Roc-A-Fella Records and Def Jam Recordings. It was considered a "comeback album" for the rapper, as 2003's The Black Album was promoted as his final release. The production on the album was handled by multiple producers including Just Blaze, DJ Khalil, Dr. Dre, The Neptunes, Swizz Beatz and Kanye West among others. The album also features guest appearances by John Legend, Beyoncé, Usher, Ne-Yo and more.

Kingdom Come was supported to four singles: "Show Me What You Got", "Lost One", "30 Something" and "Hollywood". The album received generally lukewarm reviews from music critics but was a commercial success. It debuted at number one on the US Billboard 200, selling 680,000 copies in its first week. At the 50th Annual Grammy Awards, Jay-Z earned a nomination for Best Rap Album.

Background
Kingdom Come was the first Jay-Z album released since 2003's The Black Album, which had been widely hyped as Jay-Z's "retirement" album. The video for that album's hit single "99 Problems" had ended with Jay-Z going down in a hail of gunfire. Jay-Z stated in interviews that that scene represented the "death" of Jay-Z and the "rebirth" of Shawn Carter. Because of this, Jay-Z had originally planned to release Kingdom Come under his real name of Shawn Carter, but decided in the end to release it under his more-famous stage name Jay-Z. The album's second single, "Lost One" (produced by Dr. Dre) addresses Jay's split with Roc-A-Fella co-founder Damon Dash, the death of his nephew, and supposedly his relationship with actress Rosario Dawson.

Past collaborators Kanye West and particularly Just Blaze made significant contributions to the album's production. This is the first time Dr. Dre has played a substantial role in a Jay-Z album, as he produced four beats and mixed every song on the album. Relatively unknown newcomers B-Money, Syience, and DJ Khalil also contributed to the album's production, as well as Coldplay lead singer Chris Martin. Kingdom Comes opening track "The Prelude" features additional vocals from Pain in da Ass who featured on some of Jay-Z's earlier album introductions, impersonating characters from films such as Scarface, Goodfellas, and Carlito's Way.

Critical reception

Kingdom Come received generally lukewarm reviews from music critics. At Metacritic, which assigns a normalized rating out of 100 to reviews from mainstream publications, the album received an average score of 67, based on 23 reviews. According to Pitchfork journalist Peter Macia, "the early consensus on Kingdom Come [was] that it's one of Jay-Z's worst albums." He praised the song "Minority Report" writing "It's the only song on Kingdom Come that offers any real insight into the unique position Jay-Z is in, and possibly the only one that anyone will care to remember." Reviewing the record for Rolling Stone, Rob Sheffield said "the highs are really high, and the lows are really low", particularly applauding the title track and "Trouble" while finding "Beach Chair" especially awful. Nathan Rabin wrote in The A.V. Club that contrary to the hype leading up to its release, Kingdom Come was "just another solid album" from a rapper who now "succeeds on craft and hard-won experience rather than hunger", finding it devoid of the urgent sense his previous records displayed. Robert Christgau gave it an honorable mention in his MSN Music consumer guide, naming "30 Something" and "Minority Report" as highlights while writing that Jay-Z was enjoying "the pleasures of going legit". In The New York Times, Kelefa Sanneh deemed Kingdom Come an intriguing but "halfway successful" attempt by "a grown-up rapper trying to make a grown-up album". AllMusic editor Andy Kellman was more critical, dismissing the record as "a display of complacency and retreads — a gratuitous, easily resistible victory lap — that very slightly upgrades the relative worth of The Blueprint²." Jay-Z later considered it to be his worst album.

In the 10th anniversary, Preezy Brown from Vibe write an article about the album and said: "Kingdom Come was stacked to the brim with all of the bells and whistles to compensate for any rust on the part of Hov, but ultimately would not be enough to mask the album's blemishes." They singled out "The Prelude" ("One of the superior intros in Hov's catalog"), "Lost Ones" ("one of the more heartfelt and transparent tunes of his career"), "Do U Wanna Ride" ("an open letter to former street associate-turned-inmate Emory Jones, Jay Z shows glimpses of the greatness that set him apart"), "I Made It" ("Another brief moment of brilliance on Kingdom Come, which is dedicated to the accomplishment of his mama proud") and the last two songs, "Minority Report" (one of the more unsung compositions in Jay Z's career and a stellar example of his underrated social commentary") and "Beach Chair" (an intense sonic affair that finds Jay Z reflecting on his past, present, and future, and is among the best work found on his first post-retirement album) as highlights. He said "both of which see Hov venturing outside of his comfort zone with favorable results."

The song Minority Report received further notice from hip-hop fans and critics alike especially for its production and its message. Mitch Findlay from HNHH said: "While Kingdom Come as an album is oft-maligned, largely viewed as a mediocre comeback album, there are some gems to be found. The best of which is Minority Report, an elegiac reflection on the aftermath of Hurricane Katrina. Jay is at his most somber, spitting poetry rich with images, lamenting the mistreatment from government and former Commander-In-Chief George Bush. The pattern of A-List producers continues with Dr. Dre at the boards, and Ne-yo closes off the track with a haunting, powerful refrain - “seems like we don’t even care”." The Spin staff also singled out the song as one of the high-lists on the album: "It’s not the best track to listen to on a purely aesthetic basis, with Jay rapping in a stilted flow over a plodding piano beat. But the song stands out for both its incisiveness and its honesty." and called it "one of his most interesting bits of rapping ever". At the 50th Annual Grammy Awards, Kingdom Come received a nomination for Best Rap Album; the award was won by Kanye West for his 2007 album Graduation.

Commercial performance
Kingdom Come debuted at number one on the US Billboard 200 chart, selling 680,000 copies in its first week, according to Nielsen Soundscan. This became Jay-Z's ninth US number one album and tied him with the Rolling Stones for the third most number-one albums in the US.  In its second week, the album dropped to number six on the chart, selling an additional 140,000 copies. On December 14, 2006, the album certified double platinum by the Recording Industry Association of America (RIAA) for shipments of two million copies. As of August 2009, the album has sold 1,510,000 copies in the United States, according to Nielsen SoundScan.

Track listingSamples credits'
"The Prelude" contains a sample of "Keep the Faith" by Mel & Tim.
"Oh My God" contains a sample of "Whipping Post" by Genya Ravan.
"Kingdom Come" contains samples of "Super Freak" by Rick James and "100 Guns" by Boogie Down Productions.
"Show Me What You Got" contains samples of "Shaft in Africa"  by Johnny Pate, "Show 'Em Whatcha Got" by Public Enemy, "Darkest Light" by Lafayette Afro Rock Band and "Rump Shaker" by Wreckx-n-Effect.
"Minority Report" contains a sample of "Non Ti Scordar Di Me" by Luciano Pavarotti.
"44 Fours" contains a sample of "Can I Kick It?" by A Tribe Called Quest.

Personnel
Adapted from AllMusic.

 Jason Agel – assistant engineer
 Kenneth "Bam" Alexander – drums
 June Ambrose – stylist
 Angelo Aponte – engineer
 B-Money – production
 Mark Batson – keyboards, producer
 Beyoncé – featured vocals (track 10)
 David Brown – engineer, tracking
 Jonny Buckland – guitar
 Tim Carr – assistant
 Chrisette Michele – featured artist (track 5)
 Sean Cruse – bass, guitar
 Tony Dawsey – mastering
 Andrew Dawson – engineer
 Dr. Dre – production
 Larrance Dopson – piano
 Lamar Edwards – Hammond organ
 Jacob Gabriel – assistant engineer
 Jay-Z – primary artist, executive producer
 Terese Joseph – A&R
 Doug Joswick – package production
 Just Blaze – production, drums, keyboards, mixing, producer
 John Legend – featured artist (track 6)
 Ari Levine – assistant engineer
 Anthony Mandler – photography
 Louis Marino – creative director
 Chris Martin – featured artist (track 14)
 Medi Med – engineer
 Shaun Mykals – vox organ
 Ne-Yo – featured artist (track 13)
 The Neptunes – production
 Dawaun Parker – keyboards
 Che Pope – keyboards
 Robert "Roomio" Reyes – assistant engineer
 Daniel Seeff – bass
 Sterling Simms – featured artist (track 12)
 Swizz Beatz – producer
 Usher – featured artist (track 9)
 Patrick Viala – mixing
 Kanye West – production
 Ryan West – engineer, mixing
 Pharrell Williams – featured artist (track 9)
 Dontae Winslow – arranger, horn, organ, vox organ, Wurlitzer
 Mashica Winslow – arranger

Charts

Weekly charts

Year-end charts

Certifications

See also
List of number-one albums of 2006 (U.S.)
List of number-one R&B albums of 2006 (U.S.)

References

External links
 

2006 albums
Jay-Z albums
Albums produced by DJ Khalil
Albums produced by Dr. Dre
Albums produced by Just Blaze
Albums produced by Kanye West
Albums produced by Ne-Yo
Albums produced by Mark Batson
Albums produced by the Neptunes
Albums produced by Rik Simpson
Albums produced by Swizz Beatz
Def Jam Recordings albums
Roc-A-Fella Records albums